Gabrielle T. Belz is an Australian molecular immunologist and viral immunologist. She is a faculty member of the Walter and Eliza Hall Institute of Medical Research, within the Molecular Immunology division. Belz has made important contributions to the understanding of immune system function, especially in relation to the molecular and cellular signalling pathways of immune response to viruses. Her research has focused on understanding the signals that drive the initial development of protective immunity against pathogen infections, such as influenza and herpes viruses. This includes research into how cytotoxic T cells (a type of T lymphocyte that destroys virally infected cells and tumor cells) recognise and remove virally-infected cells from the body following infection. Research into the description of the specific factors and response during infection will contribute towards the long-term development of vaccines for infectious disease, and the development of better treatments for autoimmune diseases.

Education
Belz trained as a veterinarian and completed her undergraduate studies at the University of Queensland graduating with a Bachelor of Veterinary Biology in 1990, then a Bachelor of Veterinary Science with First Class Honours in 1993. She completed a PhD in 1997 at the University of Queensland. Following her PhD, she took up a Postdoctoral Fellowship in viral immunology with Nobel Laureate Professor Peter Doherty at St Jude Children's Research Hospital in Memphis, USA. She returned to Australia to take up a position with the Walter and Eliza Hall Institute of Medical Research in 2000. In 2010, she received a Doctor of Veterinary Science from the University of Queensland.

Belz was Editor-of-Chief of Immunology and Cell Biology until 2016, and was subsequently a Deputy Editor of the journal for several years.
She is currently a Deputy Editor for the Journal of Immunology.

Awards
In 2007 Belz was awarded the Burnet Prize (recognising the Australian virologist Sir Macfarlane Burnet) for her research into how dendritic cells and cytotoxic T cells work together to defend the body from viral infections. In 2008, Belz was awarded the Gottschalk Medal by the Australian Academy of Science for her contribution to a series of pioneering discoveries illuminating how the immune system deals with viruses. In 2012, Belz was awarded the NHMRC Elizabeth Blackburn Fellowships award (recognising the Australian-American biological researcher and Nobel Laureate, Professor Elizabeth Blackburn). In 2018 she was elected Fellow of the Australian Academy of Health and Medical Sciences.

Selected publications
 Christo SN, Evrard M, Park SL, Gandolfo LC, Burn TN, Fonseca R, Newman DM, Alexandre YO, Collins N, Zamudio NM, Souza-Fonseca-Guimaraes F, Pellicci DG, Chisanga D, Shi W, Bartholin L, Belz GT, Huntington ND, Lucas A, Lucas M, Mueller SN, Heath WR, Ginhoux F, Speed TP, Carbone FR, Kallies A, Mackay LK. Discrete tissue microenvironments instruct diversity in resident memory T cell function and plasticity. Nat Immunol. 2021 Sep;22(9):1140-1151. doi: 10.1038/s41590-021-01004-1. Epub 2021 Aug 23. PMID 34426691 
 Huang Q, Jacquelot N, Preaudet A, Hediyeh-Zadeh S, Souza-Fonseca-Guimaraes F, McKenzie ANJ, Hansbro PM, Davis MJ, Mielke LA, Putoczki TL, Belz GT. Type 2 Innate Lymphoid Cells Protect against Colorectal Cancer Progression and Predict Improved Patient Survival.Cancers (Basel). 2021 Feb 1;13(3):559. doi: 10.3390/cancers13030559. PMID 33535624
 Jacquelot N, Seillet C, Wang M, Pizzolla A, Liao Y, Hediyeh-Zadeh S, Grisaru-Tal S, Louis C, Huang Q, Schreuder J, Souza-Fonseca-Guimaraes F, de Graaf CA, Thia K, Macdonald S, Camilleri M, Luong K, Zhang S, Chopin M, Molden-Hauer T, Nutt SL, Umansky V, Ciric B, Groom JR, Foster PS, Hansbro PM, McKenzie ANJ, Gray DHD, Behren A, Cebon J, Vivier E, Wicks IP, Trapani JA, Munitz A, Davis MJ, Shi W, Neeson PJ, Belz GT. Blockade of the co-inhibitory molecule PD-1 unleashes ILC2-dependent antitumor immunity in melanoma. Nat Immunol. 2021 Jul;22(7):851-864. doi: 10.1038/s41590-021-00943-z. Epub 2021 Jun 7. PMID 34099918 
 Seillet C, Luong K, Tellier J, Jacquelot N, Shen RD, Hickey P, Wimmer VC, Whitehead L, Rogers K, Smyth GK, Garnham AL, Ritchie ME, Belz GT. The neuropeptide VIP confers anticipatory mucosal immunity by regulating ILC3 activity. Nat Immunol. 2020 Feb;21(2):168-177. doi: 10.1038/s41590-019-0567-y. Epub 2019 Dec 23. PMID 31873294 
 Soon MSF, Lee HJ, Engel JA, Straube J, Thomas BS, Pernold CPS, Clarke LS, Laohamonthonkul P, Haldar RN, Williams CG, Lansink LIM, Moreira ML, Bramhall M, Koufariotis LT, Wood S, Chen X, James KR, Lönnberg T, Lane SW, Belz GT, Engwerda CR, Khoury DS, Davenport MP, Svensson V, Teichmann SA, Haque A. Transcriptome dynamics of CD4+ T cells during malaria maps gradual transit from effector to memory. Nat Immunol. 2020 Dec;21(12):1597-1610. doi: 10.1038/s41590-020-0800-8. Epub 2020 Oct 12. PMID 33046889 
 Mielke LA, Liao Y, Clemens EB, Firth MA, Duckworth B, Huang Q, Almeida FF, Chopin M, Koay HF, Bell CA, Hediyeh-Zadeh S, Park SL, Raghu D, Choi J, Putoczki TL, Hodgkin PD, Franks AE, Mackay LK, Godfrey DI, Davis MJ, Xue HH, Bryant VL, Kedzierska K, Shi W, Belz GT. TCF-1 limits the formation of Tc17 cells via repression of the MAF-RORγt axis. J Exp Med. 2019 Jul 1;216(7):1682-1699. doi: 10.1084/jem.20181778. Epub 2019 May 29. PMID 31142588
 Rankin LC, Girard-Madoux MJ, Seillet C, Mielke LA, Kerdiles Y, Fenis A, Wieduwild E, Putoczki T, Mondot S, Lantz O, Demon D, Papenfuss AT, Smyth GK, Lamkanfi M, Carotta S, Renauld JC, Shi W, Carpentier S, Soos T, Arendt C, Ugolini S, Huntington ND, Belz GT, Vivier E. Complementarity and redundancy of IL-22-producing innate lymphoid cells. Nat Immunol. 2016 Feb;17(2):179-86. doi: 10.1038/ni.3332. Epub 2015 Nov 30. PMID 26595889

References

Living people
Australian women scientists
Australian immunologists
University of Queensland alumni
Scientists from Melbourne
Year of birth missing (living people)
Fellows of the Australian Academy of Health and Medical Sciences